Ovcharenko is a surname. Notable people with the surname include:

 Artem Ovcharenko (born 1986), Russian ballet dancer
 Gennady Ovcharenko (born 1964), Russian artist
 Halyna Ovcharenko, Ukrainian composer
 Nina Ovcharenko (born 1984), Ukrainian cyclist
 Victor Ovcharenko (1943–2009), Russian philosopher and scientist
 Vladislava Ovcharenko (born 1986), Tajikistani sprinter
 Yuriy Ovcharenko (born 1968), Ukrainian footballer

See also
 

Ukrainian-language surnames